Mahmud Yalavach was a Muslim administrator in the Mongol Empire who ruled over Turkestan as governor and eventually went on to be mayor of Taidu (now Beijing). He was a Khorezmian merchant who served as an administrator and advisor to Genghis Khan. Somewhere in the 1230s, he devised the census system accounting for the people in the newly formed Mongol Empire so they could be readily taxed. He went on to simplify the existing tax systems in his creation of two primary tax initiatives: The first was the poll tax known as the qubchir and the other was an agricultural tax known as the qalan.

See also
 Society of the Mongol Empire

References

Citations

Sources 

 Lane, George. Daily Life in the Mongol Empire. p. 62. 1st ed. Greenwood Publishing Group, Inc. US. 2006.
 Christian, David. A History of Russia, Central Asia, and Mongolia. p. 415. 1st ed. Blackwell Publishing, Cornwall, United Kingdom. 1998.

Mongol Empire people